Trachelopachys cingulipes is a species of araneomorph spider from the family Trachelidae. It was first described by French naturalist, Eugène Simon, in 1886.

Distribution 
This species is endemic to Argentina, in particular the province of Buenos Aires. It is mostly found in gardens, but it can venture into the walls of houses in search of prey, which includes mostly other small arthropods (such as spiders, small beetles, ants, etc.).

Description 
As a hunting spider, it has eight front-facing eyes to help with hunting. One of its most distinguishing features is their bright orange legs with black spots.

References 

Taxa named by Eugène Simon
Trachelidae
Spiders described in 1886